2014 Shenzhen Open may refer to:
2014 ATP Shenzhen Open, an ATP World Tour tennis tournament.
2014 WTA Shenzhen Open, a WTA Tour tennis tournament.